"The Room" is a song by Scottish indie rock band The Twilight Sad. The song was released as the third single from the band's second studio album, Forget the Night Ahead. It was released on 5 April 2010 on Fat Cat Records. The song features violin by Laura McFarlane, of fellow Scottish band My Latest Novel, and was the first song to be written for the record.

"The Room" was first released as an acoustic version, under the title "Untitled #27", on the band's 2008 compilation album Killed My Parents and Hit the Road. The title of the song was inspired by the 1971 Hubert Selby Jr. novel, The Room.

The B-side of the single is an acoustic version of "The Neighbours Can't Breathe", a song also featured on Forget the Night Ahead.

Music video
The video for the song premiered on 25 February 2010 on The Line of Best Fit. It was directed by Nicola Collins, whose filmmaking work includes the award-winning documentary The End. The video features David Lynch's granddaughter in the starring role.

Track listing

Credits
 James Alexander Graham – vocals
 Andy MacFarlane – guitar
 Craig Orzel – bass
 Mark Devine – drums
 Produced by Andy MacFarlane
 Co-produced by Mark Devine and Paul Savage
 Recorded and mixed by Paul Savage
 Mastered by Alan Douches
 dlt – artwork

References

External links
 Single synopsis at Fat Cat Records

2010 singles
The Twilight Sad songs
2009 songs